Mater Dolorosa is a painting of the Mater Dolorosa produced around 1550 or 1555 by the Italian artist Titian and his studio. It is now in the Museo del Prado. It is not to be confused with his c.1554 version of the same subject, also in the Prado.

Paintings by Titian in the Museo del Prado
1550 paintings
1554 paintings
Paintings of the Virgin Mary